Pseudolaubuca sinensis is a species of freshwater ray-finned fish from the family Cyprinidae, the carps and minnows from south east Asia. It occurs in China and Vietnam.

References

Cyprinid fish of Asia
Pseudolaubuca
Fish described in 1864
Taxa named by Pieter Bleeker